Valley View High School is a public high school located in the city of Valley View, Texas in Cooke County, United States and classified as a 2A school by the UIL. It is a part of the Valley View Independent School District located in north central Cooke County. In 2015, the school was rated "Met Standard" by the Texas Education Agency.

Athletics
The Valley View Eagles compete in the following sports:

Baseball
Basketball
Cross Country
Football
Golf
Track and Field
Powerlifting
Softball
Volleyball

State Titles
Boys Cross Country - 
2014(2A), 2015(2A)
Football 
1980(1A)

Academics
UIL Academic Meet Champions 
1999(1A), 2000(1A)

References

External links
Valley View ISD website

Public high schools in Texas
High schools in Cooke County, Texas